Bill Calder (28 September 1934 – 10 November 2021) was a former Scottish footballer who played for Oxford United, Leicester City, Bury and Rochdale. Originally a midfielder, Calder was converted to a forward while playing for Bury.

Leicester City signed Calder from Port Glasgow Rovers in 1956. Calder transferred from Leicester City to Bury after three
League appearances for Leicester City in Division 1. He played as right winger for Bury, and won promotion with Bury to Division 2 in 1960–1961. Calder scored 21 goals that season, was ever present, and won a Division 3 champions medal. He then played more as a centre forward. He moved to Oxford United for £8,500 from in November 1963, and then to Rochdale in 1966.

References

External links
Rage Online profile

1934 births
Scottish footballers
Association football forwards
Leicester City F.C. players
Bury F.C. players
Oxford United F.C. players
Rochdale A.F.C. players
Macclesfield Town F.C. players
English Football League players
Living people